The 1967 Harvard Crimson football team was an American football team that represented Harvard University during the 1967 NCAA University Division football season. After gaining a share of the Ivy League crown the previous year, Harvard fell to a fourth-place tie in 1967.

In their eleventh year under head coach John Yovicsin, the Crimson compiled a 6–3 record and outscored opponents 256 to 144. Donald J. Chiofaro was the team captain.

Harvard's 4–3 conference record tied for fourth-best in the Ivy League standings. The Crimson outscored Ivy opponents 176 to 130. 

Harvard played its home games at Harvard Stadium in the Allston neighborhood of Boston, Massachusetts.

Actor Tommy Lee Jones was a guard on the team.

Schedule

References

Harvard
Harvard Crimson football seasons
Harvard Crimson football
1960s in Boston